Jean-François Caujolle (born 3 March 1952) is a left-handed former professional tennis player from France. He reached a career-high ranking of No. 59 in singles on 31 September 1977. 

Caujolle retired from tennis in 1981 and became a coach in a Marseille tennis camp. In 1993, he created the ATP International Series Open 13 in Marseille, and became co-director, alongside Cédric Pioline, of the BNP Paribas Masters tournament of Paris in 2007. In 2008, he initiated, with Gilles Moretton and Jean-Louis Haillet, the creation of the Masters France exhibition tournament in Toulouse.

Career finals

Singles (2 runner-ups)

External links
 
 

French male tennis players
Tennis players from Marseille
Living people
1952 births